Will Sankey is an Australian rugby union player who plays for the  in Super Rugby. His playing position is lock. He was named in the Force squad as a late replacement for Round 8 of the 2022 Super Rugby Pacific season.

Reference list

External links
itsrugby.co.uk profile

Australian rugby union players
Living people
Rugby union locks
Canberra Vikings players
Western Force players
Year of birth missing (living people)